The Netherlands Under-19 cricket team represents the Netherlands in Under-19 international cricket.

The team has been playing in international youth tournaments since 1979 but have only participated in one U-19 World Cup in 2000. They most recently participated in 2010 European U-19 Championship where they finished fourth, thus missing out on a chance for World Cup qualification.

Future

The team played in the 2011 European U-19 Championship which was a challenge series, involving multiple matches played over a longer period of time.

References

Under-19 cricket teams
Netherlands in international cricket
C